Live at Sticky Fingers (also known as "Live Zone") is a live DVD by the Swedish hard rock band Hardcore Superstar. It was recorded on 25 March 2006 at Sticky Fingers, Gothenburg, Sweden and was the first date on the band's tour to support their new self-titled album Hardcore Superstar.

Setlist:

"Kick On the Upperclass"
"We Don't Celebrate Sundays"
"Last Forever"
"She's Offbeat"
"Still I'm Glad"
"Hateful"
"Bag on Your Head"
"Prime Mover"
"Someone Special"
"Blood on Me"
"Standin' on the Verge"
"Wild Boys"
"Liberation"
"My Good Reputation"

Credits
Jocke Berg: Vocals
Thomas Silver: Guitar
Martin Sandvik: Bass, Backing Vocals
Magnus "ADDE" Andreason: Drums

Concert films
2006 video albums